The chestnut-bellied fantail (Rhipidura hyperythra) is a species of bird in the family Rhipiduridae.
It is found in the Aru Islands and New Guinea.
Its natural habitats are subtropical or tropical moist lowland forests and subtropical or tropical moist montane forests.

References

chestnut-bellied fantail
Birds of the Aru Islands
Birds of New Guinea
chestnut-bellied fantail
chestnut-bellied fantail
Taxonomy articles created by Polbot